Dysaules is a genus of praying mantis in the subfamily Iridinae.

Species
Dysaules brevipennis
Dysaules himalayanus
Dysaules longicollis
Dysaules uvana

See also
List of mantis genera and species

References

Tarachodidae
Mantodea genera